Linlithgow Lightning were a British speedway team based in Linlithgow, West Lothian, Scotland. They raced at Heathersfield Stadium.

History
They first raced in 1994 in the 1994 British League Division Three. In 1995 they raced in the 1995 Academy League.

During their third season they won the 1996 Speedway Conference League and the Conference League Knockout Cup.

The following season they competed in the 1997 Speedway Conference League as Lathallan Lightning before failing to field a team during 1998. The competed for one more season during the 1999 Speedway Conference League season.

The club folded in 1999 and the venue closed in October 1999.

Season summary

See also
List of United Kingdom Speedway League Champions

References

Sport in West Lothian
Defunct British speedway teams